Anne Manson (born 1961, Cambridge, Massachusetts) is an American orchestral and opera conductor.

Manson was music director of the Kansas City Symphony from 1999 until 2003, and is currently music director of the Manitoba Chamber Orchestra. In 1994, she became the first woman to conduct the Vienna Philharmonic at the Salzburg Festival, leading them in Boris Godunov by Modest Mussorgsky to critical acclaim.

Manson studied pre-med at Harvard University before switching to music, then studied music on full scholarship at the Royal College of Music in London; there she became a conductor. She was conductor of London's Mecklenburgh Opera from 1988 to 1996, then served as an assistant to Claudio Abbado. She has guest-conducted the Royal Swedish Opera, Los Angeles Philharmonic, London Philharmonic Orchestra, Saint Paul Chamber Orchestra, San Francisco Opera, Washington National Opera, and many other ensembles. She has released four recordings, three of them focused on works of Philip Glass.

References

External links

Performance schedule, Operabase

1961 births
Living people
Musicians from Cambridge, Massachusetts
Harvard University alumni
Alumni of the Royal College of Music
Women conductors (music)
20th-century American conductors (music)
21st-century American conductors (music)
Classical musicians from Massachusetts
20th-century American women musicians
21st-century American women musicians